Benjamin Sweat (born September 4, 1991) is an American professional soccer player who plays as a left-back for Major League Soccer club Sporting Kansas City.

Career

Youth and college
Sweat played soccer at Palm Harbor University High School and then went on to play college soccer at the University of South Florida between 2010 and 2013. Sweat still holds the record for most appearances in matches at South Florida. While at college, Sweat also appeared for USL PDL clubs VSI Tampa Bay and Reading United AC.

Professional
Sweat has earned experience while training with Swedish top flight club Djurgårdens IF Fotboll (2012 & 2013 summer). He also spent a summer in Czech Republic with SK Sigma Olomouc (2013 summer).

On January 16, 2014, Sweat was drafted in the first round (14th overall) of the 2014 MLS SuperDraft by Columbus Crew.

Sweat was loaned out to Columbus Crew's USL Pro affiliate club Dayton Dutch Lions in May 2014 for a few matches. Sweat was given his first professional start on June 25, 2014, in the 5th round of the US Open Cup against Chicago Fire. He also played a half against English Premier league side Crystal Palace F.C. on July 23, 2014.

After being with the first team inconsistently, Columbus Crew SC announced on February 9, 2015, that they had waived Sweat.

After being waived by Columbus, Sweat signed with NASL club Tampa Bay Rowdies on March 2, 2015. He spent the 2015 and 2016 seasons with Tampa Bay, making 33 regular season appearances for the club before leaving at the conclusion of the 2016 season.

Sweat trialed with New York City FC during their 2017 pre-season, and was signed by the club on February 23, 2017.

He signed a multi-year contract extension with New York City FC at the end of the 2017 season.

On November 19, 2019, Sweat was selected by Inter Miami in the 2019 MLS Expansion Draft.

On December 13, 2020, Sweat was traded to Austin FC ahead of their inaugural season. Following the 2021 season, Sweat's contract option was declined by Austin.

International
Sweat was called up for the USMNT for the first time in October 2018. He played in 2 games, against Colombia and Peru.

Career statistics

References

External links
 
 

1991 births
Living people
American soccer players
Association football defenders
Austin FC players
Columbus Crew draft picks
Columbus Crew players
Dayton Dutch Lions players
Major League Soccer players
North American Soccer League players
New York City FC players
Inter Miami CF players
People from Palm Harbor, Florida
Reading United A.C. players
Soccer players from Florida
South Florida Bulls men's soccer players
Sportspeople from Pinellas County, Florida
Tampa Bay Rowdies players
United States men's international soccer players
USL Championship players
USL League Two players
VSI Tampa Bay FC (PDL) players
University of South Florida alumni